Khalaf Ansar (also Romanized as Khalaf Anşār; also known as Khalaf ol Anşār, Khalīf Anşār, Khalīfeh Anşār, Khānvalāsar, and Khanvalsar) is a village in Ozomdel-e Jonubi Rural District, in the Central District of Varzaqan County, East Azerbaijan Province, Iran. At the 2006 census, its population was 50, in 7 families.

References 

Towns and villages in Varzaqan County